Joseph Nyumah Boakai (born 30 November 1944) is a Liberian politician who served as the 29th vice president of Liberia from 2006 to 2018, under President Ellen Johnson Sirleaf. He previously served as the Minister of Agriculture from 1983 to 1985.

Personal life
Joseph Boakai was born in the remote village of Worsonga in Foya District, Lofa County, on 30 November 1944. He is married to Kartumu Boakai and they have four children. Boakai is a Baptist and a deacon of the Effort Baptist Church.

Active in philanthropic efforts, Boakai supervised and personally financed a 7-mile rural village road construction near Warsonga, Liberia. He also worked with the Federation of Liberian Youth (FLY) and the Danish Youth to construct a school for 150 students and clinic for a community of 10 villages. He was active in organizing and fund raising for rural electrification of Foya Kama in Lofa County, Northern Liberia.

Before serving as vice president, Boakai consulted with a number of institutions including serving as Chief Technical Advisor on Agriculture Policy, Ministry of Agriculture. He reviewed and evaluated the Liberian 1986 proposed Green Revolution and FAO World Bank 1986 Agricultural sector Review Document and evaluated AMSCO, Amsterdam Funded training program for projects in Uganda in 1994 and Tanzania in 1996.

He is the owner of LUSU Resource Corporation and co-owner of AGROMACHINES Liberia.

Boakai has served on many boards, including as chairman of Liberia Finance and Trust Corporation, chairman of the board of Star Radio, member of the board of LOIC, member of the board of the Liberia Baptist Theological Seminary, founding member of Bethesda Christian Mission, founding organizer-African Methodist Episcopal University, founding organizer of the C.W.A. Methodist University, ambassador of the Liberia YMCA, president of LUSU Resource Corporation, and ex-president of the Monrovia Rotary Club.

As vice president, he was the president of the Liberian Senate and presided over plenary sessions of that body for two days each week. He also performed supervisory functions over a number of institutions and agencies including the Liberia National Lotteries (LOTTO), the Liberia Marketing Association (LMA), the Liberia Agency for Community Empowerment (LACE), and the National Commission on Disarmament Demobilization Resettlement and Reintegration (NCDDRR).

Education
Boakai attended primary and high school in Sierra Leone and Liberia before graduating from the College of West Africa. He later graduated from the University of Liberia in 1972 with a bachelor's degree in business administration.

Political career
Boakai went on to work in both the public and private sector. He worked as a resident manager (1973–1980) and managing director (1980–1982) for the Liberia Produce Marketing Corporation (LPMC). From 1983 to 1985, he served as Minister of Agriculture under President Samuel Doe. While Minister of Agriculture, Boakai chaired the 15 nation West African Rice Development Association. In 1992, he was the managing director of the Liberia Petroleum Refinery Company (LPRC). He later worked as a consultant to the World Bank in Washington, and also founded a firm dealing in agricultural equipment and consultancy. He has served as board chairman of the Liberia Wood Management Corporation and of the Liberia Petroleum Refining Company. He announced his intention to run for the Liberian presidency which was scheduled for 10 October 2017. 

During the first round of the 2017 elections where none of the candidates who contested was able to obtain 50% +1 votes to become the country's next president, president Ellen Johnson Sirleaf stated on several occasions that she was supporting her vice president.

After the first round, she openly said that she is not supporting either of the two candidates who made it to the run-off.  But she was seen on 21 December 2017 with George Weah at a groundbreaking ceremony for a road that is leading to the home of his rival, the vice president Joseph N. Boakai. This was harshly received by some members of the ruling Unity Party, who considered the president's action as campaigning for Weah. After the photos flooded social media, President Sirleaf clarified on the same day: "I have told the AU that I am neither supporting Senator Weah nor Vice President Boakai, although it's my right to support either of them in the run-off.  I never knew the protocol of the program until I reached to the program. When I got there I saw Senator Jewel Howard Taylor and Senator Weah, I couldn't tell the both senators to leave because they are both sitting senators. It was Senator Jewel Howard Taylor that gave the shovel to Senator Weah, at which time my head was bent down. So it was difficult for me to identify the person holding the shovel.  But however, I regret that the Vice President wasn't there, this is his road and he was needed to be here."

When Boakai was asked if he was invited or not, he said that he was never invited by the President to carry out the groundbreaking ceremony for the road that leads to his home in Lofa County.

When the vice president appeared on the Coasta Show, he said one of the reasons for which the president doesn't want to support him is his alignment with Chairman Wilmot Paye and Senator Varney G. Sherma.

Boakai was defeated by former football legend, George M. Weah, in the run-off of the 2017 presidential and representatives elections, but nonetheless paid an appreciation visit to his county, Lofa.

During his visit, he spoke of his appreciation for his people and urged them to work with the new government. Boakai said, "The purpose of my visit here is to appreciate my people for showing the high level of love and dedication…ensuring that we were successful in the process, because they did what they committed themselves to do by voting in their numbers."

The election has ended, he said, and there is a new government that will continue the work from where the Unity Party led government will stop. “I ask that we all rally around this new administration to bring the desired developments that we all want. We should all know that Liberia has won so let us support each other."

References

1944 births
Agriculture ministers
Candidates for President of Liberia
Kansas State University alumni
Liberian Baptists
Living people
People from Lofa County
University of Liberia alumni
Unity Party (Liberia) politicians
Vice presidents of Liberia
College of West Africa alumni
20th-century Liberian politicians
21st-century Liberian politicians